Greenwood Township is the name of some places in the Commonwealth of Pennsylvania, a U.S. state:
Greenwood Township, Clearfield County, Pennsylvania
Greenwood Township, Columbia County, Pennsylvania
Greenwood Township, Crawford County, Pennsylvania
Greenwood Township, Juniata County, Pennsylvania
Greenwood Township, Perry County, Pennsylvania

See also
Green Township, Pennsylvania (disambiguation)
Greenfield Township, Pennsylvania (disambiguation)
Greenville Township, Pennsylvania
Greenwich Township, Pennsylvania

Pennsylvania township disambiguation pages